New Rockford-Sheyenne Public School is a public elementary school and high school located in New Rockford, North Dakota.

District
New Rockford-Sheyenne Public School District is a school district of the publicly funded school serving the cities of New Rockford, and Sheyenne, and the surrounding rural areas. The district administration offices are in New Rockford.

Extracurricular activities

Dial
Family, Career, and Community Leaders of America
Future Business Leaders of America (FBLA)
One-Act Play
Band and Choir
SADD
National Honor Society
Speech
Student Council

Athletics

The athletic teams are known as the Rockets.

Baseball (Sheyenne/New Rockford Black Sox)
Basketball (boys' and girls')
Football
Track and Field (boys' and girls')
Volleyball
Wrestling1: This sport is joined with Carrington High School.

Championships
State Class 'B' boys' track and field: 1961, 1971
State 9-Man football: 2012
State Class 'B' boys' basketball: 2003 sixth place, 2004 fifth place, 2005 Champions 
State Class 'B' girls' basketball: 2009 fourth place

Notable people

Former staff
 Joan Heckaman - North Dakota Senator

Former students and alumni
 Tracy Weber - journalist

References

External links
New Rockford-Sheyenne Public School website

Public high schools in North Dakota
Public elementary schools in North Dakota
Public middle schools in North Dakota
Schools in Eddy County, North Dakota
School districts in North Dakota
Public K-12 schools in the United States
North Dakota High School Activities Association (Class B)